Shuiyousphaeridium is an extinct genus of acritarch discovered in 1993. Dated to 1.8Ga, it represents one of the earliest fossil eukaryote taxa.

References

Acritarch genera